is a former Japanese football player.

Club statistics

References

External links

j-league
 

1989 births
Living people
Senshu University alumni
Association football people from Kanagawa Prefecture
Japanese footballers
J2 League players
Japan Football League players
Mito HollyHock players
FC Machida Zelvia players
Association football forwards